Faafu Atoll Hospital is located in the island of Nilandhoo in Faafu Atoll, Maldives. It is part of the Atoll Hospital health authority.

History
Faafu Atoll Hospital was initially established as Faafu Nilandhoo Health Centre on 30 April 1996 and was upgraded to hospital on 16 December 2006 as the atoll hospital for Faafu Atoll. The hospital is a dream come true for the people of Faafu atoll in pursuit of improved medical care in the atoll itself. Laboratory services began at the hospital on 7 April 2002 as well as X-ray service on 26 March 2007.

External links
 Faafu Atoll Hospital

Hospitals in the Maldives
Hospitals established in 2006